Davide Gavazzi (born 7 May 1986) is an Italian footballer who plays as a midfielder for  club Renate.

Career
Born in Sondrio, Lombardy, Gavazzi started his career at Lombard team Como. He was the member of the reserve in 2003–04 to 2004–05 season. The club bankrupted in 2005 and a new company was admitted to 2005–06 Serie D. Gavazzi joined the new club and played for  seasons. Gavazzi won the 2007–08 Serie D and the 2007–08 Coppa Italia Serie D. However Gavazzi left the club mid-season, for Renate. Renate was the losing semi-finalist of the 2009 promotion playoffs.

Vicenza
In July 2009 Gavazzi was signed by Serie B club Vicenza Calcio.

On 24 August 2012 he took no.7 shirt previously worn by Pasquale Maiorino, who changed to no.11.

Sampdoria
On 7 September 2012, Gavazzi was signed by Serie A club U.C. Sampdoria for €1.2 million in 4-year contract. Vicenza acquired Franco Semioli and Marco Padalino outright for free, as well as the loan of Gavazzi and Zsolt Laczkó. In January 2013 Vicenza released Gavazzi from loan. Gavazzi played 7 times for Sampdoria in Serie A, all in 2013–14 season.

Ternana (loan)
On 21 January 2014, he was loaned to Serie B side Ternana Calcio.

On 22 August 2014 the loan was renewed.

Avellino
On 10 July 2015 he was signed by Avellino in a 3-year contract.

Pordenone
On 19 July 2018, Gavazzi signed for Serie C outfit Pordenone in a 2-year contract. On 10 February 2021, his contract with Pordenone was terminated by mutual consent. On 11 January 2022, he signed a new contract with Pordenone until the end of the 2021–22 season.

Return to Renate
On 25 July 2022, Gavazzi returned to Renate on a one-year contract.

Honours
Como
 Serie D: 2007–08
 Coppa Italia Serie D: 2007–08

References

External links
 Lega Serie B Profile 
 Football.it Profile 

Italian footballers
Como 1907 players
A.C. Renate players
L.R. Vicenza players
U.C. Sampdoria players
Ternana Calcio players
U.S. Avellino 1912 players
Pordenone Calcio players
Serie A players
Serie B players
Serie C players
Association football midfielders
People from Sondrio
Footballers from Lombardy
1986 births
Living people
Sportspeople from the Province of Sondrio